The Appalachian temperate rainforest is located in the southern Appalachian Mountains of the eastern U.S. About 351,500 square kilometers (135,000 square miles) of forest land is spread across eastern Kentucky, southwestern Virginia, western North Carolina, the northwestern portion of South Carolina, northern Georgia, northern Alabama, and eastern Tennessee. The Southern Appalachian spruce–fir forest is a temperate rainforest located in the higher elevations in southwestern Virginia, western North Carolina and East Tennessee. Fir is dominant at higher elevation, spruce at middle elevation, and mixed forests at low elevation.

Climate
The Appalachian temperate rainforest has a cool and mild climate. This temperate rainforest is classified as a perhumid temperate rainforest.

Precipitation in this area incorporates moist air from the Gulf of Mexico and western Atlantic Ocean. When the moist air reaches the Appalachian mountains then rain falls by the orographic effect. In addition to the increased precipitation from orographic lift, cloud cover in the Appalachian temperate rainforest keeps the rate of water loss due to evapotranspiration low. Water intercepted by clouds accounts for 20% to 50% of annual precipitation, which is a relatively high rate. In the Appalachian temperate rainforest of eastern Canada, fog contributes 5 to 8% of annual precipitation. According to the tentative classification advocated by DellaSala, Alaback, Spribille, Wehrden, and Nauman in 2011, high-elevation temperate rainforest regions in Central Appalachia could be interpreted as "a southerly extension of Appalachian boreal rainforests from Eastern Canada", although this interpretation requires further study.

History
The Appalachian Mountains started to form in the middle Ordovician period by the collision of plates. The collision which caused the uplift of the mountains began around 440 to 480 million years ago and ended around 230 million years ago. This range has an important role of forming the temperate rainforest in this area, because of the orographic effect. In the Last Ice Age, ice did not cover the south Appalachian Mountains. Uncovered area was a refuge for animals and plants which lived in northern areas. After the ice receded, some species spread back to north, while some of them stayed in this area. This is one of the reasons why there is a high biodiversity in the temperate rainforest.

Species
High mountains make northern species able to survive. At the present, many plants form the temperate rainforest and the forests have a high rate of biodiversity. About 10,000 species, including endemic salamanders and turtles live in this area.

Flora
Red spruce and Fraser fir are dominant canopy trees in high mountain areas. In higher elevation (over ), Fraser fir is dominant, in middle elevation red spruce and Fraser fir grow together, and in lower elevation red spruce is dominant. Yellow birch, mountain ash, and mountain maple grow in the understory. Younger spruce and fir and shrubs like raspberry, blackberry, hobblebush, southern mountain cranberries, red elderberry, minniebush, and southern bush honeysuckle are understory vegetation. Below the spruce-fir forest, at around 
, are forests of American beech, maple, birch, and oak. Skunk cabbage and ground juniper are northern species that remained in this region after the glacier retreated.

The wet environment supports the high diversity of fungi. Over 2000 species live in this area and scientists estimate many unidentified fungi may be there.

Fauna
More than 30 species of salamanders are found in the rainforest and some of them are endemic, such as Black Mountain salamander, southern dusky salamander, Jordan's salamander, and Cheat Mountain salamander. Rotten trees and moist leaves on ground provide a good, wet environment for amphibians, including salamanders. Many species of salamanders in this area do not have lungs, so they breathe through their skin and the wet environment is conducive for their survival.

As mammals, the most familiar is likely the American black bear. Other common mammals are white-tailed deer and groundhog. Northern species like northern flying squirrel and red squirrel survive in the area because of the cool climate.

Human use
Native Americans have lived in this area for about 10,000 years. After contact with European settlers, the vast majority of the Cherokee Nation were forced to move in 1838 to 1839 from their traditional homeland to Oklahoma during the Trail of Tears.

Public lands
Rainforests can be found on public land in Appalachia in the Daniel Boone National Forest, Jefferson National Forest, Pisgah National Forest, Nantahala National Forest, Chattahoochee National Forest, the Cherokee National Forest, and the Great Smoky Mountains National Park. State parks incorporating Appalachian temperate rainforest include Breaks Interstate Park and Gorges State Park.

The Appalachian Trail extends  from Georgia to Maine and provides public access to many areas of the Appalachian temperate rainforest.

Threat

Anthropogenic
Air pollution is caused by anthropogenic factors, such as power plants, factories, and automobiles. It is related to acid rain and water pollution. Vegetation at high elevation easily collects pollutants. Acid rain damages the plants and makes streams more acidic. Acidic water affects aquatic species, such as fish, salamanders, and also vegetation. Air pollution affects ground ozone, which experiences a biochemical change with sun light. The ground ozone damages plants. In the National Park Service, 30 plants species were damaged by the ground ozone and plants in higher elevation are prone to damage.

Non-native species are another threat. For example, Balsam Woolly Adelgids, an insect which was accidentally introduced from Europe kills Fraser fir. Many dead fir trees stand on mountain peaks.

Fire
Wild fire is created by lightning on average twice per year, usually in May or June. Although fire created by lightning is a natural disturbance and can be a threat, it is an important factor for ensuring biodiversity; Some native species, such as table mountain pines and woodpeckers, benefit from the environmental changes after fire.

In the Great Smoky Mountains National Park, the National Park Service performs controlled burns: "to invigorate a species or ecosystem that benefits from fire" and "to reduce heavy accumulations of dead wood and brush which under drought conditions could produce catastrophic wildfires that threaten human life and valuable property." While some rare plants thrive after a controlled fire, many others are destroyed.

See also
Appalachian-Blue Ridge forests
Appalachian bogs
Cove (Appalachian Mountains)

References

External links
 Appalachian Trail, National Park Service
 A Precipitation and Flood Climatology with Synoptic Features of Heavy Rainfall across the Southern Appalachian Mountains

Appalachian forests
Ecoregions of the United States
Temperate rainforests
Temperate broadleaf and mixed forests in the United States
Temperate coniferous forests of the United States

Blue Ridge Mountains
Natural history of the Great Smoky Mountains
Plant communities of the Eastern United States